Dmitriyevka is a rural locality (a selo) and the administrative center of Dmitriyevsky Selsoviet of Svobodnensky District, Amur Oblast, Russia. The population was 387 as of 2018. There are 5 streets.

Geography 
Dmitriyevka is located on the right bank of the Bolshaya Pera River, 17 km north of Svobodny (the district's administrative centre) by road. Yukhta is the nearest rural locality.

References 

Rural localities in Svobodnensky District